Wayne Brett Westner (28 September 1961  4 January 2017) was a South African golfer. He was twice winner of the South African Open and also won twice on the European Tour. In partnership with Ernie Els, they won the 1996 World Cup of Golf, played at the Erinvale Golf Club near Cape Town. Els won the individual event with Westner second and the pair won the team event by 18 shots.

Biography
Westner was born in Johannesburg. He turned professional in 1981 and won several events in his home country, including two South African Opens. He spent many years on the European Tour where he won two tournaments and had a best Order of Merit finish of twentieth in 1993. In the 1992 Carroll's Irish Open, he lost to Nick Faldo at the fourth hole of a sudden-death playoff. In partnership with Ernie Els, they won the 1996 World Cup of Golf for South Africa. Westner finished second, behind Els, in the individual event and the pair won the team event by 18 shots. He won the Sunshine Tour Order of Merit in 1995/96.

At the 1998 Madeira Island Open, during the pre-tournament Pro-Am, Westner tore ankle ligaments after falling over six feet when a railway sleeper crumbled under him. He played only once more that season, and was never able to recover. He later ran his own golf college, The Wayne Westner Golf College.

Westner committed suicide in Pennington, KwaZulu-Natal, on 4 January 2017.

Professional wins (13)

European Tour wins (2)

1Co-sanctioned by the Sunshine Tour

European Tour playoff record (0–1)

Sunshine Tour wins (11)
1983 ICL International
1988 Southern Suns South African Open
1989 Southern Africa Tour Winter Championship
1990 AECI Charity Classic, PX Pro-Celebrity Classic, Sun City Classic
1991 Protea Assurance South African Open
1992 Wild Coast Sun Classic
1995 San Lameer South African Masters, Wild Coast Challenge
1996 FNB Players Championship (co-sanctioned by the European Tour)

Other wins (1)

Results in major championships

Note: Westner never played in the Masters Tournament nor the PGA Championship.

CUT = missed the half-way cut
"T" = tied

Team appearances
Dunhill Cup (representing South Africa): 1994, 1996
World Cup (representing South Africa): 1994, 1996 (winners), 1997
Alfred Dunhill Challenge (representing Southern Africa): 1995 (winners)

References

External links

South African male golfers
Sunshine Tour golfers
European Tour golfers
Suicides by firearm in South Africa
Golfers from Johannesburg
White South African people
1961 births
2017 suicides